Sophie Viney (born 1974) is an English composer and arranger. Her compositions have been performed at significant venues such as the Royal Festival Hall, Wigmore Hall and St. Martin-in-the-Fields and her music has featured in the Spitalfields Festival and the Brighton Festival. In February 1999, Viney received critical acclaim in The Times for her work Music of the Spheres which was described as "eerily conjured". Her choral work Missing God was commissioned under the Society for the Promotion of New Music's Adopt a Composer programme and performed by the London Oriana Choir in 2003. She has written for the Philharmonia and has also written for theatre groups such as Watford Palace Theatre, and Barbican Studio Theatre. On 7 March 2015, Sonatina in 7 and 5 was broadcast on BBC Radio 3 as part of a programme aired on the eve of International Women's Day. Her music is influenced by phenomena ranging from the wedding chant of Masai warriors to passages from scripture.

Biography 
Viney began composing around the age of 7 or 8 and in the years that followed, developed her craft to the extent that she gained entry to the Royal College of Music studying composition with Jeremy Dale Roberts and Simon Bainbridge. Whilst studying for her BMus she also studied piano and conducting. After graduating, she undertook postgraduate study at the Guildhall School of Music and Drama with Robert Saxton where she gained a Master of Music in composition. Viney has received awards for composition, amongst them, the Adrian Cruft prize and the Sullivan and Farrer prize and she was awarded a Fellowship by the Arts Council to facilitate the researching of her opera on a theme inspired by the Gaarder novel, Through a Glass Darkly.

Selected works 
 A Time to Dance
 Dartmoor Theme
 Detective Theme
 Kingdom of Heaven
 Missing God
 Music of the Spheres
 Norfolk Suite (Three movements)
 Sonatina in 7 & 5
 To The Seaforths

Arrangements 
 Ting-a-ling (Reprise)
 We Know Where They Are
 When This Bloody War is Over

Music for theatre 
 All's Well that Ends Well
 Monster Song (from The Wild Things show)
 Staring Magic (from The Wild Things show)
 Wild Rumpus Dance (from The Wild Things show)

Music for film 
 Voyage instrumental track (used by Vagabonds Cinema)

References

External links 

 Sophie Viney on Soundcloud

1974 births
Living people
Alumni of the Royal College of Music
British women classical composers
People associated with the Royal College of Music
Alumni of the Guildhall School of Music and Drama
People associated with the Guildhall School of Music and Drama
English composers
English classical composers
20th-century women composers
21st-century women composers
Women classical composers
20th-century classical composers
21st-century classical composers
Composers for piano
Choral composers